Robert James Dyer (born 4 December 1986 in Port Elizabeth) is a South African rugby union player, currently playing with Eastern Province Grand Challenge club side Despatch.

Career

Youth

Mighty Elephants / Eastern Province Kings

He started their Currie Cup compulsory friendly match against  in June 2009 and made his debut in the Currie Cup proper when he started their match against  in Uitenhage, making a total of nine appearances in that competition.

He remained a fringe player for the team though, making twelve appearances in 2010, seven in 2011 and three in 2012.

Despatch

He was released by the Eastern Province Kings at the end of 2012 and joined amateur club side Despatch. He was a member of the Despatch side that won the inaugural SARU Community Cup competition in 2013 SARU Community Cup, playing in all seven their matches during the competition.

Eastern Province Kings

References

South African rugby union players
Eastern Province Elephants players
Living people
1986 births
Rugby union players from Port Elizabeth
Rugby union hookers